Numatic International Ltd (Founded as Numatic Engineering Limited) is a British manufacturer, primarily producing domestic, commercial and industrial cleaning and maintenance equipment distributed worldwide. It is one of the major producers of vacuum cleaners in the United Kingdom and produces the Henry domestic vacuum cleaner and its related models, which are canister designs having human names and "smiling face" appearance. 

The company owns a manufacturing facility in Chard, Somerset, south-west England, and four wholly owned international distributors in France, Germany, the Netherlands, and South Africa. In 2017 the company employed over 1000 people and produced 4,500 units per day, over 40% of which are exported.

Founding
Chris Duncan launched Numatic in 1969, having seen a need for a rugged and reliable cleaner to clean the inside of boilers. He started with an oil drum, found a washing-up bowl that fitted on top, and ordered 5,000. The prototype is in the Numatic museum. The two-inch oil drum thread is still used for the later Henry models' nose.

One evening during a trade show in the mid-1970s, Duncan and a salesman, bored, dressed up one of their current commercial cleaners with ribbon, a union flag badge, and something like a hat, then chalked a crude smile under the hose connector. The next day visitors noticed it and laughed; Duncan then decided to ask his advertising people to design a proper face; they nicknamed the result "Henry". At another trade show a children's hospital was interested in the cleaners to encourage the recovering children to help with the cleaning. Production, still focussed on the commercial market, was increased. The Henry models became the company's major product.

Domestic vacuums (Henry)  

One of Numatic's most popular products is the Henry canister vacuum cleaner. It has a large smiling face on the front of the canister. The vacuum's hose connector, or hose if fitted, forms its nose. The face was originally three stickers that had to be applied to the canister, but the face was then applied directly to the body, and later replaced by a 3D clip-on face which is fitted by the user in regions where a factory-fitted face is considered a dangerous risk encouraging children to play with the device. The concept of the smiling face, the Henry name, and the various colours the vacuum cleaner comes in, were designed by Michael Walsh . A new parking bracket was added in September 2012. Since the introduction of Henry in 1981, over 10 million had been produced worldwide by 2017. Henry, along with his female counterpart Hetty, now have merchandise based on them (such as plush toys and T-shirts). There are also Henry desktop cleaners for cleaning desks and tables, which are neither made nor sold by Numatic International, but by Paladone Products.

Henry has a number of models, such as the Henry Cordless (which is run off chargeable batteries), the Henry Micro (which reduces exposure to allergens), and the Henry Xtra (which is made specifically for carpets and cleaning pet hair). Henry also has many variations of the name that is on the vacuum, such as Hetty (which is pink, has long eyelashes, and leans towards a female target market), Harry (which is green, was originally called Henry Hound, and leans towards pet owners), James (which was originally yellow, but its colour was changed to blue in 2019, and has a caddy top), and many others. Henry is most prominent in the United Kingdom where it is manufactured, but it can be purchased in other countries. Since Henry'''s original release in 1981, a family of vacuum cleaners have been introduced in different sizes and colours with different specifications and uses (including a wet and dry model and a multi-functional wet/dry and carpet shampoo cleaner). All the original series, some of which have now been discontinued, are based on British names, such as Basil, Edward, Charles and George.

Numatic International has also made many vacuum cleaners differing from the 2010 range, many of which are no longer sold as of 2016. The Henry and Hetty vacuum cleaners have also, since 2010, expanded to desktop cleaners, toys, spray mops, boxes and office file holders (and a specially-made Airo-Brush head has also been made for them).  Accessories for them include stainless steel tubes, HepaFlo dust bags, an upholstery tool, a crevice tool, a Nuflex threaded hose, a double taper hose/full adapter, two 36-volt battery packs (which only apply to Henry and Hetty Cordless), a Numatic Airo-Brush Head with rotating bristles (only applying to Henry Xtra), a soft dusting brush and an upholstery nozzle with a sliding brush.

 Commercial, industrial, and specialized products
Numatic International manufactures janitorial cleaning systems under the name VersaCare''.

References

External links
 Numatic International official website

1969 establishments in the United Kingdom
Chard, Somerset
Companies based in Somerset
Manufacturing companies established in 1969
Home appliance manufacturers of the United Kingdom
Vacuum cleaner manufacturers
English brands